The Buenos Aires Hockey Association ("Asociación de Hockey de Buenos Aires" - AHBA) is the Argentine amateur governing body that regulates the practice of field hockey over the Buenos Aires autonomous city and its urban sprawl, Greater Buenos Aires. The AHBA is not affiliated to national body Argentine Hockey Confederation, organizing its championships in an autonomous way since 1908.

The most important tournaments organized by the AHBA are the Women's and Men's Torneo Metropolitano.

Clubs affiliated 
Nowadays the AHBA has registered more than 100 clubs from the city of Buenos Aires and Greater Buenos Aires. Below are some of the most notable members of the body:

 Arsenal de Sarandí
 Atlético y Progreso
 Banco Nación
 Banco Provincia
 Banfield
 Belgrano A.C.
 CASA de Padua
 C.A. San Isidro
 Buenos Aires Cricket & Rugby Club
 Centro Naval
 Champagnat
 Ciudad de Buenos Aires
 DAOM
 Deportiva Francesa
 Ducilo
 Estudiantes (LP)
 Ferro Carril Oeste
 Gimnasia y Esgrima (BA)
 Gimnasia y Esgrima (LP)
 Hindú
 Huracán
 Hurling
 Italiano
 Jockey Club (R)
 Liceo Militar
 Lanús
 Liceo Naval
 Lomas
 Los Andes
 Los Matreros
 Los Cedros
 Manuel Belgrano
 Mitre
 Monte Grande
 Náutico Hacoaj
 Nueva Chicago
 Newman
 Olivos
 Platense
 Pucará
 Pueyrredón
 Quilmes
 Regatas (BV)
 Club Atlético River Plate
 San Albano
 San Andrés
 San Cirano
 San Luis
 San Fernando
 San Lorenzo
 San Martín
 San Patricio
 San Telmo
 San Isidro Club
 SITAS
 Temperley
 Tigre R.C.
 Tristán Suárez
 UAI Urquiza
 Universitario (BA)
 Universitario (LP)
 Universitario (R)
 Vélez Sarsfield

See also
 Metropolitano de Hockey (Women)
 Metropolitano de Hockey (Men)

References

External links
 

Field hockey in Argentina
Sports clubs in Argentina